CPAConnect is an affiliate association of CPAmerica made up of small, independent Certified Public Accountant firms and sole practitioners in the United States, Puerto Rico and Mexico. CPAConnect is an alliance of CPAmerica, Inc., one of the nation’s largest associations of major independent CPA firms. Both associations operate out of CPAmerica’s headquarters building in Gainesville, Florida.

Total revenue of all CPAConnect firms is approximately $155 million. Average firm size is seven employees, which includes two partners. The total number of employees nationwide surpasses 1,650.

CPAConnect members receive practice management advice, CPE training, marketing products and access to national consultants. They share knowledge and information through e-mail discussion lists, conference calls, an online sharing library, an annual CPAConnect conference and other conferences with CPAmerica members.

History

Founded in 1994, CPAConnect was created by its parent association, CPAmerica. Within a year, membership had grown to 60 firms. By 2004, membership had expanded to include more than 150 firms and, by 2015, nearly 200 firms.

External links 
 CPAConnect Website https://web.archive.org/web/20180421064246/http://cpaconnect.com/
 CPAmerica Website https://web.archive.org/web/20200623202926/https://cpamerica.org/
 Crowe Global https://www.crowe.com/global

Organizations established in 1994
Trade associations based in the United States
Accounting organizations